The Marseille-Cassis Classique Internationale is an annual half marathon which follows a course from Marseille to Cassis in France during the last weekend in October. It has the silver label of the IAAF Road Race Label Events and is thus among the ten more prestigious half marathon races in the world. First organised by the SCO Sainte-Marguerite sports club in 1979, the event has grown into a large international competition, with around 20,000 runners competing every year. The course distance of 20,308 metres falls slightly short of the true half marathon distance (21,097.5 m). Since 2012, the course has been shortened by 308 metres so the total distance of the course became exactly 20 kilometres. Still, the race is made more difficult by a long 327 m rise up a hill—the Col de la Gineste—at the midpoint of the course, which eventually follows back down into the port of Cassis. The annual race is usually held in the month of October.

The course records are held by Atsedu Tsegay, who has the men's race record with 58:11 minutes, and Edith Chelimo, who has the women's record with 1:05:58.

There are also two other races which complement the main competition: first organised in 1990, the "L'Autre Marseille-Cassis" (The Other Marseille-Cassis in English) is a mountain hike which negotiates the Massif des Calanques area. The second complementary competition is a racewalk, launched in 2006, which seeks to celebrate the sports festival through an alternative sporting means.

List of winners
Key: 

All winners information taken from official website
<small>(*)Course records not valid due to race shortened by about 400 metres in the days before the race.

References

External links
Official website 

Half marathons in France
Sport in Marseille
Recurring sporting events established in 1979
1979 establishments in France
Annual sporting events in France
Autumn events in France
20K runs